Cors Goch National Nature Reserve is principally a fen in a shallow valley near the village of Llanbedrgoch, on the eastern side of Anglesey. The site is managed by the North Wales Wildlife Trust and also includes calcareous heath, meadow and an acid heath overlain on millstone grit. There is some area of open water including Llyn Cadarn but much is marsh or shallow bog which supports a species rich ecosystem dominated by reeds.  A number of rare plants and animals are able to flourish in this environment, including great crested newt and adders. The medicinal leech and glow worm have also been found here. The site is managed by the North Wales Wildlife Trust.

References

External links 
 Cors Goch Nature Reserve, North Wales Wildlife Trust
 Cors Goch Nature Reserve, Countryside Council for Wales

National nature reserves in Wales
Nature reserves in Anglesey
Llanfair-Mathafarn-Eithaf